The Castellers de Sarrià was a human towers team from Sarrià district in Barcelona that was created in 1998 and made their official debut in 2000.

History

Starting with the recruitment of local people at a cultural associations exhibition that took place in Sarrià district, training sessions began at the Casal de Sarrià urban garden. More and more people joined, some of whom were already members of other cultural groups like the  de Sarrià, the  i Drac de Sarrià, as well as those who came from other districts or even cities.

On Oct. 12th 1999 the Castellers de Sarrià completed a non-official performance.
The structures that the Castellers de Sarrià built that day were the 4 by 6, the 2 by 5, the 3 by 6 and the usual pillar of 4 at the beginning and end of the show.  
The local team was able to build a 3 by 6 (although it collapsed during the disassembly phase), a 4 by 6 plus pillar, a 4 by 6 and 2 pillars of 4.

In 2002 the Castellers de Sarrià sponsored the  team on the occasion of their official presentation.

The best human towers structures ever built by the Castellers de Sarrià before its breakup in 2005 were the pillar of 5 (only assembled) and the 2 by 6.

Some years later, at the end of 2011, a group of local people thought of creating a new human towers team in Sarrià-Sant Gervasi districts who, after reaching an agreement with the former Castellers de Sarrià representatives, were going to use the same shirt colour and the same emblem and would become Barcelona's seventh human towers team. However this attempt didn't succeed and the new team never performed.

On October 2016, the team was refunded and in May 2017 it is elected to be a team in formation by the CCCC (Coordinadora de Colles Castelleres de Catalunya). In the Festa Major de Sarrià (October 8, 2017) they was presented to their neighbours making a pillar of 4, 2 trials of a 3 by 6, a 3 by 6 and ending with a pillar of 4 at the balcony.

References

Castellers
Sarrià-Sant Gervasi
1998 establishments in Spain